Brewin is a surname, which may refer to the following people:
 Members of Canada's political family
 Andrew Brewin (1907–1983), Canadian lawyer and politician
 Gretchen Brewin (born 1938), Canadian politician and wife of John
 John Brewin (born 1936), Canadian politician, son of Andrew, and husband of Gretchen
 Beryl Brewin (1910 – 1999), New Zealand marine zoologist
Christopher Brewin (1945 - 2018), British international relations scholar
 Frank Brewin (1909–1976), Indian field hockey player
Jennifer Brewin, Canadian theatre creator and artistic director
 John A. Brewin (1876–1938), American college sports coach